Shyama (born Khurshid Akhtar; 7 June 1935 – 14 November 2017) was an Indian actress who appeared in Hindi films. She was active between 1945 and 1989. She is best known for her roles in Aar Paar (1954 film) and Barsaat Ki Raat (1960 film).

Career
Born as Khurshid Akhtar in Lahore, Punjab in British India on 7 June 1935 into a Muslim family, Shyama moved to MUmbai from Lahore in the 1940s. As a young girl, she acted in a few films such as Noor Jehan's husband Shaukat Hussain Rizvi's Zeenat (1945 film)  and Meerabai (1947). She worked with Shammi Kapoor in romantic classic Mirza Sahiban (1957).

Director Vijay Bhatt gave her the stage name Shyama, by which she is credited in her movies. She had starring roles in Guru  Dutt's classic Aar Paar (1954 film), and later in Barsaat Ki Raat (1960 film), which was perhaps her best performance. She was a major star in the 1950s and 1960s and acted in more than 150 movies, many in starring roles. During the period 1952 – 60, she appeared in as many as 80 films, mostly in leading roles. In 1963, she had as many as 18 releases and in 1964 she had 17 releases.

Awards and recognition
Her best known roles were in Aar Paar (1954), Barsaat Ki Raat (1960) and Tarana. She was also noticed for her versatility through her performances in Milan,  Bhai-Bhai (1956), Mirza Sahiban (1957), Bhabhi (1957) and Sharada (1957).
For her performance in Sharada, she was awarded the Filmfare Award for Best Supporting Actress.

She was the actress in late 50s who has been most responsive to the rhythm and lyrics of the music directors and poets. Songs picturised on her such as "Ae Dil Mujhe Bata De", "O Chand Jahan Wo Jaye", "Ae Lo Main Hari Piya", "Dekho, Wo Chand Chhup Ke Karata Hai Kya Ishare", "Chhupa Kar Meri Aankhon Ko", "Sun Sun Sun Sun  Zalima" and "Ja Re Ka Re Badara" are examples of her sensitive acting. She did a double role in Do Bahen (1959), portraying twins who were completely different in character.

She quoted in an interview: "I never needed to be taught [about acting]... I was confident and didn't need to think too much." She believed stars are born and not made.

Johnny Walker and Shyama had worked in films such as Choo Mantar, Aar Paar, Musafir Khanna, Khota Paisa and Khel Khilari Ka.

In later years, her memorable roles came in films of Rajesh Khanna such as Masterji (1985) and Ajanabee (1974) and others such as Sawan Bhadon (1970) and Dil Diya Dard Liya (1966).

Personal life
She was married to cinematographer Fali Mistry in 1953. Her husband was a Parsi (Zoroastrian) from Bombay, India. They kept the marriage secret for as many as 10 years because of the fear that Shyama's career would suffer if her marriage became known; in those days, it was thought that the fan following of female stars became less as soon as they married. The marriage was revealed to the public shortly before the birth of their first child, their elder son. The couple had three children, two sons, Faroukh and Rohin, and a daughter Shirrin. Fali Mistry died in 1979, thereafter she continued to stay in Mumbai. Their marriage seemed to have worked out well and they got along well with each other. In a 2013 interview, she reportedly said, "My greatest weakness was always Fali."

Shyama's close friends were actress Ameeta and Johnny Walker. Nasir Kazi, Johnny Walker's son, expressed his grief on hearing the news of her death. In an interview with Mid-Day, he said, "It's really disheartening to know about the demise of Shyama aunty. She had done several films with my father and in a lot of them, she paired with him also. In fact, in the film that was made on his name "Johnny Walker", she was the heroine with him.
Her son Faroukh Mistry is a cinematographer. Faroukh's previous film to hit the theatres was Angrezi Mein Kehte Hain in the year 2018.

Death
Shyama died on 14 November 2017 due to a lung infection at the age of 82. She is buried at Badakabarastan, Marine Lines in Mumbai, India.

Selected filmography

References

External links
 
 Shyama Filmography Upperstall

1935 births
2017 deaths
Actresses from Lahore
Actresses in Hindi cinema
Filmfare Awards winners
Indian film actresses
People from British India
Punjabi people
20th-century Indian women
20th-century Indian people